José Óscar Valerio Mendoza (born 9 June 1987) is a Dominican footballer who plays as a midfielder for Atlético Vega Real and the Dominican Republic national team.

International career
Valerio made his international debut for Dominican Republic on 25 March 2015, being a second-half substitute in a 0–3 friendly loss against Cuba.

References

External links
 

1987 births
Living people
People from La Vega Province
Dominican Republic footballers
Association football midfielders
Dominican Republic international footballers
Liga Dominicana de Fútbol players